Godaesan is a mountain in South Korea. Its area extends across Yeoncheon, Gyeonggi-do and Cheorwon County, Gangwon-do.

See also
 List of mountains in Korea

Notes

References
 

Mountains of Gyeonggi Province
Yeoncheon County
Mountains of Gangwon Province, South Korea
Cheorwon County
Mountains of South Korea